The 2015 Exeter City Council election took place on 7 May 2015, to elect members of Exeter City Council in Exeter, Devon, England. This was on the same day as other local elections.

Results summary

Results by ward

Alphington

Cowick

Duryard

Exwick

Heavitree

Mincinglake

Priory

St Davids

St Leonards

St Loyes

St Thomas

Topsham

St Thomas

References

2015 English local elections
May 2015 events in the United Kingdom
2015
2010s in Exeter